Thomas Okey (1852–1935) was an expert on basket weaving, a translator of Italian,  and a writer on art and the topography of architecture and art works in Italy and France.

In 1919, he became the first Serena Professor of Italian at Cambridge University. Okey was a hereditary basket maker from a poor East End of London family, and on his appointment at Cambridge, he stated,  and Okey was a member of the Art Workers' Guild and was elected Master in 1914.

Works
Venice and its Story (1904)
Paris and its Story (1904)
Dante's Purgatorio (translator).
The Little Flowers of Saint Francis of Assisi
The Story of Avignon (1926)
The Little Flowers of St. Francis
Selections From the Vita NuovaThe Old Venetian Places and Old Venetian FolkA Basketful of Memories: An Autobiographical Sketch'' (1930)

References

External links
 
 
 

British non-fiction writers
1852 births
1935 deaths
British translators
Translators of Dante Alighieri
Professors of the University of Cambridge
British male writers
Male non-fiction writers
Masters of the Art Worker's Guild